Epopella is a genus of symmetrical sessile barnacles in the family Tetraclitidae. There are about six described species in Epopella.

Characteristics

Species
These species belong to the genus Epopella:
 Epopella breviscutum (Broch, 1922)
 Epopella eoplicata Buckeridge, 1983
 Epopella eosimplex (Darwin, 1854)
 Epopella kermadeca Foster, 1978
 Epopella plicata (Gray, 1843)
 Epopella simplex (Darwin, 1854)

References

Barnacles